According to the contemporary Chronicle of Fredegar, the Battle of Wogastisburg was a battle between Slavs (Sclav, cognomento Winidi) under King Samo and Franks under King Dagobert I in 631. The Frankish armies advanced into the area of the Slavic tribal union in three groups - Alamanni, Lombards, and Austrasian Franks. The first two were quite successful, but the main fighting force was defeated in a three-day battle near a place referred to as Wogastisburg.

The site of the battle cannot be successfully located because the source, Fredegar's chronicle, gives no geographical specifications. Thus a lot of places claim to be connected with the battle (usually based on linguistic parallels and some excavations), such as Rubín hill near Podbořany (Bohemia), Úhošť hill near Kadaň (Bohemia), Bratislava (Slovakia), Trenčín (Slovakia), Beckov (Slovakia), Váh river = Voga (Slovakia), Staffelberg near Bad Staffelstein (Upper Franconia), Burk near Forchheim (Upper Franconia), Vienna, Augustianis and other places along the middle Danube etc.

In fact, there is no conclusive evidence for any of these locations and it is even possible that the term Wogastisburg referred only to a kind of temporary encampment rather than a permanent settlement, in which case establishing a definite location would be impossible.

Notes

West Slavic history
Wogastisburg
Wogastisburg
Wogastisburg
631
7th century in Francia